is a railway station in the city of  Noda, Chiba, Japan, operated by the private railway operator Tōbu Railway. The station is numbered "TD-14".

Lines

Station layout
The station has one island platform serving two tracks connected to the street by an overpass. The station building is elevated, and is built over the platform. Nanakōdai Depot, the main depot for the Urban Park Line, is located to the west of the line north of the station.

Platforms

Adjacent stations

History
Nanakōdai Station was opened on July 1, 1968.

From 17 March 2012, station numbering was introduced on the Tobu Urban Park Line, with Nanakōdai Station becoming "TD-14".

Passenger statistics
In fiscal 2018, the station was used by an average of 7,119 passengers daily.

Surrounding area

 Noda Chuo High School

See also
 List of railway stations in Japan

References

External links

 Tobu Railway Station information 

Railway stations in Chiba Prefecture
Railway stations in Japan opened in 1968
Tobu Noda Line
Stations of Tobu Railway
Noda, Chiba